Gulabjaam is a 2018 Indian Marathi language comedy-drama film directed by Sachin Kundalkar. Its cast includes Siddharth Chandekar and Sonali Kulkarni in the lead roles and Chinmay Udgirkar, Madhura Deshpande in supporting roles. It was released on 16 February 2018.

Plot 

Aditya (Siddharth Chandekar), an NRI banker, lies to his family about going back to London for the job, but instead goes to Pune to learn vegetarian Marathi cooking from Radha (Sonali Kulkarni). Even though very rude and stubborn at the beginning, Radha opens up to Aditya as the movie progresses. Radha teaches him various aspects of cooking like shopping for vegetables, cleaning utensils etc. Together they start a service called 'Dial-A-Chef' where they go to people's house and cook them a meal. Aditya is still conflicted about whether to tell his family about his plans to start a restaurant and his passion for food, when he is confronted by his fiancée, who wants him to continue being a banker. It is later revealed that Radha had been in a coma for 11 years and cooking is all she remembers. She becomes fond of Aditya. She becomes really angry when she finds out about Aditya's plans to go to London and start a restaurant. But she later realises that she has to let him go.

Cast 
Siddharth Chandekar as Aditya Naik
Sonali Kulkarni as Radha Agarkar
 Madhura Deshpande as Neha
Chinmay Udgirkar as Amey
 Mahesh Ghag as Popat
 Mohanabai as Rukmini Mavshi
 Priya Bapat as London Hotel Customer (cameo)

References

External links 
 
मराठी खाद्यसंस्कृतीचं ताट प्रेक्षकांसमोर आणणारा गुलाबजाम

2018 films
Indian comedy-drama films
2018 comedy-drama films
2010s Marathi-language films
Films directed by Sachin Kundalkar